In toroidally confined fusion plasma experiments the term zonal flow means a plasma flow within a magnetic surface primarily in the poloidal direction. This usage is inspired by the analogy between the quasi-two-dimensional nature of large-scale atmospheric and oceanic flows, where zonal means latitudinal, and the similarly quasi-two-dimensional nature of low-frequency flows in a strongly magnetized plasma.

Zonal flows in the toroidal plasma context are further characterized by
 being localized in their radial extent transverse to the magnetic surfaces (in contrast to global plasma rotation),
 having little or no variation in either the poloidal or toroidal direction—they are m = n = 0 modes (where m and n are the poloidal and toroidal mode numbers, respectively),
 having zero real frequency when analyzed by linearization around an unperturbed toroidal equilibrium state (in contrast to the geodesic acoustic mode branch, which has finite frequency).
 Arising via a self-organization phenomenon driven by low-frequency drift-type modes, in which energy is transferred to longer wavelengths by modulational instability or turbulent inverse cascade.

See also
 Zonal and poloidal
 Zonal flow
 List of plasma (physics) articles

References

Plasma physics